Pensons Arm (also known as Pinsent's Arm) is a local service district and designated place in the Canadian province of Newfoundland and Labrador. Pensons Arm, is a coastal village in Labrador, 20 km southeast of Charlottetown. It has a population of 43 in the 2021 census.

Geography 
Pensons Arm is in Labrador within Subdivision B of Division No. 10. Topographically it is surrounded by St. Michaels Bay, an inlet of the Labrador Sea to the north and Scrammy Bay to the east.

Demographics 

Government 
Pensons Arm is a local service district (LSD) that is governed by a committee responsible for the provision of certain services to the community. The chair of the LSD committee is Harrison Campbell.

See also 
Charlottetown, Newfoundland and Labrador
List of designated places in Newfoundland and Labrador
List of local service districts in Newfoundland and Labrador

References 

Designated places in Newfoundland and Labrador
Local service districts in Newfoundland and Labrador